The 1898 VFL Season was the Geelong Football Club's second season in the Victorian Football League and its second with Jack Conway as captain.

Geelong finished the home and away with 9 wins and 5 losses, finishing in fourth position. In the final series, Geelong finished with 2 wins and 1 loss, finishing in second position on the Section B Ladder. Geelong failed to qualify for the semi-final.

The leading goalkicker was Eddy James with 26 goals.

Playing List 
Twelve Geelong players made their VFL debuts and a total of 34 players were used during the season. Six players played 17 games for Geelong this season, and, Eddy James again was the club's leading goalkicker with 26 this season.

Statistics

Season summary 
In a quite competitive season, Geelong's 9-5 record meant that Geelong finished in fourth position on the ladder and, therefore, qualified for the Section B finals group. In Section B, Geelong had a 2-1 record which meant the finished in second position and did not qualify for the semi-finals.

Results

Ladder

Section B Ladder

References

Geelong Football Club seasons
1898 in Australian rules football